Yushan is a county in the northeast of Jiangxi province, China. The county is Jiangxi's gateway to bordering Zhejiang province.

The climate is temperate there with abundant rainfall in the monsoon season, and has clearly differentiated summers and winters.

Administration
Yushan has been a county for over 1,300 years. Administratively the county is part of the prefecture-level city Shangrao. The county administers 21 townships.

In the present, Yushan County has 1 subdistrict, 11 towns and 6 townships.
1 subdistrict
 Fenglin

11 towns

6 townships

Climate

Economy
Over the last fifty years, the county has harnessed its eight major rivers for power. It has three large hydropower stations with installed capacity of about 1.2 megawatts.

The county is relatively a lagger in economic development. But it boasts affluent mining resources, like flagstones and limestones.

Transportation
Yushan is a stop on the Zhe-Gan Railway, leading from Shanghai, Hangzhou to Nanchang and further south to Guangzhou and Hong Kong. At the end of 2002, the county was also incorporated into the national network of roads with the construction of a highway to Shanghai. Its closest airport is one in Quzhou, which flies to various domestic destinations.

Miscellaneous
Yushan is famous nationwide for its distinctive success in school education, which is quintessential by the Yushan No.1 Middle School. Founded in 1939, the school is cradle of about 1,000 graduates beyond the master's degree. It is applying for one of China's top 1,000 elementary and middle schools.

Sights
Every year, tens of thousands of domestic and foreign tourists flock to Yushan's picturesque Mount Sanqing, which has been officially designated as a National Scenic Area.

Huaiyu Mountains are also a tourist attraction. In the Song dynasty, the great neo-Confucianist Zhu Xi taught there. In Republican times, the area also hosted a guerrilla affiliated to the Communist Party of China, led by then legendary general Fang Zhimin.

References

Shangrao
County-level divisions of Jiangxi
National scenic areas
Tourist attractions in Jiangxi